The Chott el Hodna is a very shallow saline lake in Algeria. It is located within an endorheic basin in the Hodna region, towards the eastern end of the Hautes Plaines. The Chott el Hodna includes seasonal brackish and saline pools and marshes, but the central zone of the lake is characterized by a complete absence of vegetation.

J. Despois argues that the Chott el Hodna is not a proper Chott, but a Sebkha.

Ecology
The chott area provides an important habitat for certain endangered species such as the Cuvier's gazelle, the marbled duck and different kinds of bustards, as well as indigenous fish species.
The Chott el Hodna was declared a Ramsar site on 2 February 2001.

See also

Geography of Algeria
Hodna

References

External links
Mohamed Meouak, Le Hodna occidental entre régions méditerranéennes et plaines désertiques : organisation des terroirs, communautés rurales et productions agricoles au Moyen Âge
 Introduction: Les hautes plaines de l'Est de l'Algérie

Lakes of Algeria
Salt flats
Geography of M'Sila Province
Geography of Batna Province
Ramsar sites in Algeria